Gresham is a village in Shawano County, Wisconsin, United States. The population was 586 at the 2010 census.

History

The community was named for Walter Q. Gresham, who was the Postmaster General at the time the post office opened in December, 1883.

Geography
Gresham is located at  (44.8530328, -88.7881604).

Demographics

2010 census
As of the census of 2010, there were 586 people, 239 households, and 145 families living in the village. The racial makeup of the village was 67.9% White, 0.2% African American, 24.1% Native American, 0.7% from other races, and 7.2% from two or more races. Hispanic or Latino of any race were 3.2% of the population.

There were 239 households, of which 31.4% had children under the age of 18 living with them, 39.3% were married couples living together, 16.3% had a female householder with no husband present, 5.0% had a male householder with no wife present, and 39.3% were non-families. 33.5% of all households were made up of individuals, and 16.4% had someone living alone who was 65 years of age or older. The average household size was 2.45 and the average family size was 3.12.

The median age in the village was 36.7 years. 27.5% of residents were under the age of 18; 9% were between the ages of 18 and 24; 23.7% were from 25 to 44; 20.1% were from 45 to 64; and 19.6% were 65 years of age or older. The gender makeup of the village was 49.1% male and 50.9% female.

2000 census
As of the census of 2000, there were 575 people, 233 households, and 143 families living in the village. The population density was 503.3 people per square mile (194.7/km2). There were 257 housing units at an average density of 225.0 per square mile (87.0/km2). The racial makeup of the village was 68.70% White, 0.17% African American, 23.48% Native American, 0.52% from other races, and 7.13% from two or more races. Hispanic or Latino of any race were 2.09% of the population.

There were 233 households, out of which 32.2% had children under the age of 18 living with them, 41.2% were married couples living together, 15.0% had a female householder with no husband present, and 38.6% were non-families. 34.3% of all households were made up of individuals, and 17.6% had someone living alone who was 65.

Images

References

External links

Visit-Gresham, Official Village of Gresham Website
Village of Gresham, Wisconsin website 
 Gresham, Wisconsin is at coordinates .

Villages in Shawano County, Wisconsin
Villages in Wisconsin